Melrose is an unincorporated community in Carroll County, Maryland, United States.

History

Melrose used to be a small town, with a train track running in its center. The town also had its own post office and zip code. The community still has a small gas station, liquor store and general store called Piper's, and another gas station. The community contains a Used Car Station and mini storage called Melrose Mini Storage.

References

Unincorporated communities in Carroll County, Maryland
Unincorporated communities in Maryland